Gregory C. Zipadelli, nicknamed "Zippy", (born April 21, 1967) is an American crew chief in NASCAR. He is currently the competition director at Stewart-Haas Racing. Zipadelli is most notable for being the crew chief of the #20 car for Joe Gibbs Racing drivers Tony Stewart and Joey Logano from 1999 to 2011. He has won 34 races and two championships in 2002 and 2005 as a crew chief.

Racing career
Zipadelli began his career in the NASCAR Whelen Modified Tour series, becoming the crew chief for his family's team and immediately winning a championship with driver Mike McLaughlin in 1988, at the age of 21. When McLaughlin advanced to the Busch North Series in 1990, Zipadelli joined him, winning five races during the pair's four-year tenure together, and claimed another championship in 1997 as the crew chief for Mike Stefanik.

In 1999 he joined Joe Gibbs Racing, partnering with IndyCar Series champion turned NASCAR rookie Tony Stewart. Their accomplishments include the 1999 Rookie of the Year title, winning a rookie-record 3 races, three Chase for the NEXTEL Cup appearances, and two championships in 2002 and 2005.  The duo of "Smoke" (Stewart) and "Zippy" (Zipadelli) currently have the longest crew chief-driver relationship in NASCAR. However, that relationship ended as of the 2008 season with Stewart's departure from JGR.

Beginning in 2009, Stewart moved over to Stewart-Haas Racing to drive the #14 Chevrolet. JGR Nationwide driver Joey Logano took over the driving of the #20 Toyota, with Zipadelli continuing as crew chief.

As of December 2011, Zipadelli moved to Stewart-Haas Racing to reunite with Stewart, but as competition director, not as crew chief. Steve Addington, also a former JGR crew chief, headed to SHR in 2012 to fill the role of Stewart's crew chief. It was later announced that Zipadelli would be a part-time crew chief for Danica Patrick in the Daytona 500 in 2012, with her later 9 races undecided. On October 20, 2013, Zipadelli filled in for Steve Addington as crew chief for the #14 of Austin Dillon in the 2013 Camping World RV Sales 500 at Talladega Superspeedway, as Addington's wife was giving birth.

He briefly returned to his role as a crew chief on June 14, 2020, in the Xfinity Series when Chase Briscoe’s crew chief, Richard Boswell, was suspended. The race was a success, as Briscoe won, giving Zipadelli his first Xfinity Series win as a crew chief.

References

People from Berlin, Connecticut
1967 births
Living people
NASCAR crew chiefs
People from Mooresville, North Carolina